The Nisg̱aa Museum (or Hli G̱oothl Wilp-Adoḵshl Nisg̱aa) is a museum of the Nisg̱aa people that is located in Lax̱g̱altsʼap, a village in northwestern British Columbia, Canada.  The Nisg̱aa name means "the heart of Nisg̱aa House crests," a name that celebrates the role of tribal crests in Nisg̱aa society.  The museum is a project of the Nisg̱aa Lisims Government and opened in the spring of 2011. It is a place for display of Nisg̱aa artifacts, sharing traditions and ideas, and a centre for research and learning. The museum's collection of Nisg̱aa culture is  "one of the preeminent collections of Northwest Coast aboriginal art" The museum's website states: "This is our gift to each other, our fellow Canadians and the world."

Exhibits
In the late 19th and early 20th centuries, many Nisg̱aa artifacts and treasures were destroyed or removed from the Nass Valley by missionaries who established themselves along the Nass River. The Ancestors' Collection (Anhooyaahl Gaangigatgum ) houses a core collection of over 330 artifacts returned to the Nisg̱aa from the Royal British Columbia Museum, the Canadian Museum of Civilization, and the Anglican Church of Canada through the negotiated Nisga'a Treaty. The entrance to the exhibits is through a replica of a Nisg̱aa longhouse which are exhibited in four galleries:

Transformation Gallery:  an array of (naxnok or spirits) masks and a celebration of the Nisg̱aa performers who brought these spirits to life.
Halayt Gallery: a display of items used by Nisg̱aa shamans to summon, focus, and direct supernatural forces.
Ayuuk Gallery: a chiefs box (or hoohlgan) displaying the regalia and possessions that symbolize the social roles and structures prescribed by the Nisg̱aa laws and customs ("Nisg̱aa Code, or Ayuukhl Nisg̱aa).
Living River Gallery:  a display of possessions used in daily life in a traditional Nisg̱aa longhouse, on the land, or along the banks of the Nass River (or Lisims).

Most of the artifacts are displayed in the open with only the most delicate or valuable behind glass, all secured by motion sensors. Included in the displays are four house poles (totem poles), representing the four Nisg̱aa clans, that were carved specifically for the museum.

Future exhibits are planned to show both natural history and recent history of the Nisg̱aa people, including the struggle for the return of traditional lands and evolution into the self-governing Nisg̱aa Nation. Future additions are intended to include a variety of media including an audio guide, audio/visual presentation, museum book, a searchable database, archival software systems, a library and teaching centre, and a gift shop for Nisg̱aa art and artists.

Facilities
Planning for the museum began in the 1990s and funding was allocated as part of the treaty settlement.  In September 2010 a formal repatriation ceremony welcomed the return of the artifacts to the Nisg̱aa, which were delivered with Royal Canadian Mounted Police escort.  The $14 million facility opened on May 11, 2011, the 11th anniversary of the signing of the Nisga'a Treaty.

The architecture emulates traditional Nisg̱aa forms:  the floor plan a feast bowl, the cross section a traditional longhouse, and the roof a canoe.  The canoe form and its siting on a gravel amphitheater, evoking images of a beach, are also references to the motto for the Nisga'a Treaty signing: “our canoe has landed.”.

The facility has the only Class A climate-controlled gallery space in British Columbia's northwest (as of 2014) and has state of the art security.

References

External links
Nisgaa Museum
Nisga'a Museum - Nisga'a Lisims Government 
Nisga'a Nation Knowledge Network
Photo gallery on the exhibit designer's webpage

Nisga'a
Nass Country
First Nations museums in Canada
Museums in British Columbia